Immanuel Nobel the Younger (24 March 1801 – 3 September 1872) was a Swedish engineer, architect, inventor and industrialist. He was the inventor of the rotary lathe used in plywood manufacturing. He was a member of the Nobel family and the father of Robert Nobel, Ludvig Nobel,  Alfred Nobel and  Emil Oskar Nobel . In 1827 he married the children's mother,  Andriette Ahlsell. He also often experimented with Nitroglycerin with his sons, which led to his son Emil Oskar's death because of an explosion at his father's factory Heleneborg in Stockholm in 1864.

Nobel moved to Russia from Sweden in 1838, to sell his inventions in Saint Petersburg, where he lived for two decades with his family. In Saint Petersburg he was attached to the Evangelical Lutheran Church of Saint Katarina along with other Swedes such as Johan Patrik Ljungström, with whom he may have collaborated. Among his successful creations was an improved version of an underwater exploding mine that personally interested Tsar Nicholas I of Russia. Immanuel founded a war supplies factory, Fonderies et Ateliers Mécaniques Nobel Fils, which turned out to be a very profitable business. However, the death of Nicholas I in 1855 and the end of the Crimean War in 1856 brought about a shift in Russian policies and the new Tsar Alexander II ordered a severe cut in the military budget that eventually placed Immanuel's company in serious economic difficulties. In 1859, the technical management of Nobel Fils was passed to Immanuel's son Ludvig and the former returned to Sweden. In 1862, Immanuel's firm was finally sold by his creditors.

References

Sources

Schück, Henrik, Ragnar Sohlman, Anders Österling, Carl Gustaf Bernhard, the Nobel Foundation, and Wilhelm Odelberg, eds. Nobel: The Man and His Prizes. 1950. 3rd ed. Coordinating Ed., Wilhelm Odelberg. New York: American Elsevier Publishing Company, Inc., 1972, p. 14.  (10).  (13). (Originally published in Swedish as Nobelprisen 50 år: forskare, diktare, fredskämpar.)
Yergin, Daniel (2003): The Prize: the Epic Quest for Oil, Money and Power, Free Press, p. 58. 
Åsbrink, Brita (2001): Ludvig Nobel: "Petroleum har en lysande framtid!" Wahlström & Widstrand, p. 19.

External links

Immanuel Nobel

1801 births
1872 deaths
19th-century Swedish businesspeople
19th-century businesspeople from the Russian Empire
19th-century Swedish inventors
Inventors from the Russian Empire
Immanuel